Francisco Lupi (March 6, 1920 – January 14, 1954) was a Portuguese chess master.

In January 1940, he lost a game to Alexander Alekhine in Estoril (it was a blindfold simultaneous display, Alekhine played blindfold against eight of the best Portuguese players). In February 1940, he drew a game with Alekhine in Estoril (simultaneous display).
Lupi was a noted Portuguese player during World War II. During the forties and early fifties, he played tournaments and many simultaneous exhibitions in Spain. In Spring 1945, he lost a match against Ramón Rey Ardid (+1 –5 =0) in Zaragoza (Saragossa). He took part in the International Chess Tournament of Gijon  -1945 and 1946-; Lupi had lost his game with Alekhine. In August 1945, he tied for 3rd-4th in Sabadell (Alekhine won); Lupi had lost his game with Alekhine. In Autumn 1945, he won, ahead of Alekhine, in Cáceres (Lupi beat Alekhine). In January 1946, he lost a match to Alekhine (+1 –2 =1) in Estoril, Portugal.

In 1946, he finished last at the London B–Tournament, scoring 2.5/11 (+1 =3 =7); Max Euwe won. In 1951, he played in Madrid (Pablo Morán won). Lupi died at Madrid in January 1954.

References

External links
Francisco Lupi at chessgames.com
Francisco Lupi at 365Chess.com
Chess Notes No. 4388 about Francisco Lupi

1920 births
1954 deaths
Portuguese chess players